Mory Sidibé (born 17 June 1987) is a French volleyball player, a member of France men's national volleyball team and Cypriot club Omonia Nicosia, 2015 European Champion, a gold medalist of the 2015 World League.

Career
On October 18, 2015 French national team, including Sidibe, achieved title of the European Champion 2015 (3–0 with Slovenia in the finale).

Sporting achievements

Clubs

National championships
 2006/2007  French Championship, with Stade Poitevin Poitiers
 2007/2008  French Championship, with Stade Poitevin Poitiers
 2010/2011  Belgium Championship, with Noliko Maaseik
 2012/2013  Slovenian Cup, with ACH Volley Ljubljana
 2012/2013  
Slovenian Championship, with ACH Volley Ljubljana
 2013/2014 
Paris volley 
 2013/2014 silver medal French cup
Paris volley
 2013/2014 
winner Cev European Cup 
silver medal French championship
 2017/2018  Cyprus Cup, with Omonia Nicosia
Mvp of the season

National team
 2005  CEV U19 European Championship
 2006  CEV U21 European Championship
 2015  FIVB World League
 2015  CEV European Championship

References

External links
 LegaVolley player profile

1987 births
Living people
People from Noisy-le-Grand
French people of Malian descent
French men's volleyball players
French expatriate sportspeople in Turkey
Expatriate volleyball players in Turkey
French expatriate sportspeople in Belgium
Expatriate volleyball players in Belgium
French expatriate sportspeople in Italy
Expatriate volleyball players in Italy
French expatriate sportspeople in Slovenia
Expatriate volleyball players in Slovenia
French expatriate sportspeople in China
Expatriate volleyball players in China
Sportspeople from Seine-Saint-Denis
Opposite hitters